The Vair is a  river in the Vosges department in Grand Est in northeastern France. It rises in Dombrot-le-Sec and flows generally northwest to join the Meuse at Maxey-sur-Meuse.

References

Rivers of France
Rivers of Grand Est
Rivers of Vosges (department)